The Tithe Barn, Sturry, Kent, England is a barn dating from the early 16th century. The barn was built as the tithe barn for the grange of St Augustine's Abbey, Canterbury. At the Dissolution of the monasteries, the grange came into the ownership of Thomas Smythe who converted some of the buildings into a country house, Sturry Court. The barn continued in use for agricultural storage. In the early 20th century, Sturry Court was the country home of Alfred Milner who renamed it Milner Court. On his death in 1925, his widow, Violet, gifted the estate to The King's School, Canterbury which operated a preparatory school on the site. The school was opened by Rudyard Kipling, a friend of the Milners, in 1929. The site is now the Junior School for The King's School and the tithe barn has been restored and repurposed as a performing arts centre. "Sturry's most memorable building", the tithe barn is a Grade I listed structure.

History
The Abbey of St Augustine was founded in Canterbury in 598. As was common, the abbey established a number of granges on its lands, which operated as agricultural estates generating revenues and produce for the abbey. The resulting produce, and the tithes (taxes) collected by the abbey, were stored in tithe barns. The tithe barn at Sturry is a late manifestation of this economic system, dating from the early 16th century. Within some forty years of its construction, the Dissolution of the monasteries brought an end to the religious houses and the granges which had supported them. That at Sturry was bought by Thomas Smythe who built a country house on the site, which he named Sturry Court.

In the early 20th century, Sturry Court, renamed Milner Court, was the country home of Alfred Milner, 1st Viscount Milner. Milner served as High Commissioner for Southern Africa, was a cabinet minister in several British governments during and after World War I and was a notable proponent of British imperialism. On his death in 1925, his widow, Violet, gave the Sturry estate to The King's School, Canterbury which developed a preparatory school on the site.  It was opened by Rudyard Kipling, a friend of the Milners, in 1929. The site is now the Junior School for The King's School and the tithe barn has been restored and repurposed as a performing arts centre and assembly hall.

Architecture
John Newman, in his 2013 revised edition, Kent: North East and East, in the Pevsner Buildings of England series, calls the tithe barn, "Sturry's most memorable building". The barn is constructed of red brick with its tiled roof supported by ten king posts. The tithe barn is a Grade I listed structure.

Notes

References

Sources
 
 

Grade I listed buildings in Kent
Buildings and structures completed in the 16th century
Grade I listed agricultural buildings
Barns in England
Tithe barns in Europe